On April 13, 2014, shortly after midnight, a bus traveling from Villahermosa to Mexico City collided with a broken-down truck and caught fire, killing at least 36 people, all of whom were businesspeople from the Veracruz region. There were four survivors. The collision took place near the municipality of Juan Rodriguez Clara, which is itself near Acayucan. The bus was owned by a car-rental company called "Turtle", and the truck was owned by a milk protein company called "Prolat". The truck had been on the shoulder of the highway prior to being hit by the bus. Javier Duarte, the governor of Veracruz, said that because the bus caught fire, it will be much more difficult to identify the victims' bodies. A Veracruz Civil Defense Agency official said the victims probably burned to death inside the bus.

Reactions
Mexico's president, Enrique Peña Nieto expressed his condolences to the victims' families via Twitter. Mexico's Secretariat of Communications and Transportation, Gerardo Ruiz Esparza, also lamented the accident on Twitter, writing, "My deepest condolences to the families of the people who passed away in this accident."

See also 
2022 Tamaulipas bus crash, similar Mexican bus-truck crash in 2022
Álamo bus accident, similar Mexican bus-truck crash in 2012
List of traffic collisions (2000–present)

References

Bus incidents in Mexico
2014 road incidents
2014 in Mexico
History of Veracruz
April 2014 events in Mexico